Mihkel Mihkelson (25 December 1899 Surju Parish, Pärnu County – 13 September 1943 Tubelsk) was an Estonian politician. He was a member of IV Riigikogu.

References

1899 births
1943 deaths
Members of the Riigikogu, 1929–1932
Members of the Riigikogu, 1932–1934
Estonian Social Democratic Workers' Party politicians
Estonian prisoners and detainees
Estonian people who died in Soviet detention
People who died in the Gulag
University of Tartu alumni
People from Saarde Parish